Oxynoemacheilus parvinae is a species of stone loach which is endemic to the drainage of the Sirvan River, a tributary of the Tigris in Kermanshah Province of Iran where it prefers reasonable fast flowing, relatively clear water of a gravel substrate. it has not been evaluated for The IUCN Red List of Threatened Species but it may be threatened by drought, water abstraction and pollution. The specific name honours Parvin Etesami, a  famous Iranian poet of the 20th-century.

References

parvinae
Taxa named by Golnaz Sayyadzadeh
Taxa named by Soheil Eagderi
Taxa named by Hamid Reza Esmaeili
Fish described in 2016
Endemic fauna of Iran